Leonardo Fioravanti may refer to:
 Leonardo Fioravanti (doctor) (1518–1588), Italian doctor
 Leonardo Fioravanti (engineer) (born 1938), Italian car designer and engineer
 Leonardo Fioravanti (surfer) (born 1997), Italian surfer